"19 You + Me" is the debut single by American country music duo Dan + Shay. It was released in October 2013 as the first single from their debut album for Warner Bros. Nashville. The album, Where It All Began, was released on April 1, 2014. The song was written by Dan + Shay and Danny Orton. It received 59 adds in its first week at country radio, becoming the most added debut single of 2013.

"19 You + Me" peaked at numbers 7 and 11 on both the Billboard Hot Country Songs and Country Airplay charts respectively. It also reached outside the top 40 of the Hot 100 at number 42. The song was certified platinum by the Recording Industry Association of America (RIAA), and has sold 720,000 units in the United States as of October 2014. It received similar chart success in Canada, reaching number 23 on the Country chart and number 47 on the Canadian Hot 100.

Critical reception
The song received a positive review from Taste of Country which praised the "warm details" and "emotion." It said that "young artists aren't often able to tell stories as effectively as those with a little more age, but Dan Smyers and Shay Mooney can count on vivid lyrics to help them through." It went on to say that "the instrumentation is country with pop leanings" and "they add some missing sensitivity to the current landscape."

Music video
The music video was directed by Brian Lazzaro and shot in Myrtle Beach, South Carolina, in which they mention Myrtle Beach in the song. Some of the locations they shot at were the Fun Plaza arcade on Ocean Blvd and the Myrtle Beach Boardwalk.

Commercial performance
"19 You + Me" debuted at number 55 on the US Billboard Country Airplay chart for the week of October 26, 2013. It also debuted at number 49 on the US Billboard Hot Country Songs chart for the week of November 9, 2013. The song debuted at number 96 on the US Billboard Hot 100 chart for the week of January 18, 2014. As of October 2014, the song has sold 720,000 copies in the United States. On December 17, 2015, the song was certified platinum by the Recording Industry Association of America (RIAA) for sales of over a million digital copies in the United States.

"19 You + Me" was certified Gold by Music Canada in December 2016.

Charts

Weekly charts

Year-end charts

Certifications

References

2013 songs
2013 debut singles
Dan + Shay songs
Warner Records singles
Songs written by Danny Orton
Songs written by Shay Mooney
Songs written by Dan Smyers
Song recordings produced by Scott Hendricks